Nada Ludvig-Pečar (May 12, 1929 in Sarajevo, Bosnia and Herzegovina - 31 March 2008 in Vienna, Austria) was a Bosnian composer. She was a student of Miroslav Špiler and Lucijan Marija Škerjanc. Starting in 1969 she taught music theory at the Sarajevo Music Academy. She was also co-author of several music text books. She retired as Professor of The Science of Musical Forms, from the Sarajevo Academy of Music in the 1990s.

Her music is mainly modernist, and she excelled in the solo song repertory.

References

Melita Milin. "Nada Ludwig-Pečar", Grove Music Online, ed. L. Macy (accessed November 25, 2006), grovemusic.com (subscription access).
http://www.projectopus.com/nada_ludvig_pecar Bosnia International Music Festival

Women composers
Croatian composers
1929 births
2008 deaths
20th-century women musicians